Gorilla Warfare — a pun on the phrase guerrilla warfare — may refer to:

"Gorilla Warfare" (Dad's Army), an episode of Dad's Army
"Gorilla Warfare" (The Flash), an episode of The Flash
"Gorilla Warfare", an episode of Beast Wars
JLApe: Gorilla Warfare!, a 1999 DC Comics crossover event
Gorilla Warfare, a 2014 storyline in The Flash comic book series
GorillaWarfare or Molly White, American software engineer, Wikipedia editor, and cryptocurrency critic

See also 
 Guerrilla (disambiguation)
 Gorilla (disambiguation)